Enrique Chagoya (born 1953) is a Mexican-born American painter, printmaker, and educator. The subject of his artwork is the changing nature of culture. Chagoya teaches at Stanford University, in the department of Art and Art History. He lives in San Francisco.

Biography 
Enrique Chagoya was born in Mexico City in 1953. He was partly raised by an Amerindian nurse who helped him to respect the indigenous people of his country and their history. He studied economics at the National Autonomous University of Mexico in Mexico City from 1971 to 1974. As a student, he was sent to work on rural development projects with a focus on economics, an experience that strengthened his interest in political and social activism. While attending a rural development program he married an American sociologist working on the same program, Jeanine Kramer.

In 1977, Chagoya and his first wife Jeanine Kramer visited McAllen, Texas. In 1979, Chagoya immigrated to the United States to Berkeley, where he worked as a freelance illustrator and graphic designer. In 1984, he earned a BFA degree at the San Francisco Art Institute; and in 1987 a MFA degree at the University of California at Berkeley.

He received the Stanford University's the Dean's Award in the Humanities in 1998. In 2000, Chagoya became a citizen of the United States.

His controversial artwork "The Misadventures of the Romantic Cannibals", which portrays Jesus, and possibly other religious figures, in a context of ambiguous sexual content, is part of a ten-artist exhibit called "The Legend of Bud Shark and His Indelible Ink" which is on display in a city-run art museum in Loveland, Colorado. The copy on exhibit in Loveland, one of a limited edition of 30 lithographs, was destroyed by a woman wielding a crowbar on October 6, 2010. According to the artist the work is a commentary on the Catholic sex abuse cases. The woman is set to go to court on October 15, 2010.

In 2021, Chagoya was awarded the Guggenheim Foundation Fellowship.

Collections

References

Further reading
 Chagoya, Enrique, Enrique Chagoya, Locked in Paradise, Reno, Nevada, Nevada Museum of Art, 2000.
 Hickson, Patricia et al., Enrique Chagoya, Borderlandia, Des Moines, Iowa, Des Moines Art Center, 2007.

External links
 Oral history interview with Enrique Chagoya, 2001 July 25-August 6, from Archives of American Art, Smithsonian Institution

20th-century Mexican painters
20th-century American male artists
Mexican male painters
21st-century Mexican painters
Artists from Mexico City
San Francisco Art Institute alumni
1953 births
Living people
Mexican contemporary artists
Artists from the San Francisco Bay Area
National Autonomous University of Mexico alumni
Stanford University Department of Art and Art History faculty
University of California, Berkeley alumni
20th-century American printmakers
20th-century Mexican male artists
21st-century Mexican male artists